Chinonso Nnamdi Offor  (born 27 May 2000) is a Nigerian professional footballer who plays as a striker for  Major League Soccer club CF Montréal.

Club career
Offor was born on 27 May 2000 in Jos, Nigeria but grew up in Ekwulobia in Anambra after having fled Jos due to riots. In 2012, he began playing for Real Sapphire in Lagos. In 2017, Offor moved to Northern Cyprus and joined Binatlı Yılmaz, a club that was not affiliated with FIFA or UEFA.

In 2019, Offor received an offer to join Latvian club Daugavpils and signed with them for the 2019 season. On 21 August 2019, Offor made his competitive debut for Daugavpils in the Latvian Cup against Jelgava, starting in the 2–1 defeat. He then scored his first goal in his Virslīga debut against Jelgava, scoring the opener in the 2nd minute of a 2–2 draw. Offor ended his first season in Latvia with 6 goals in 14 matches. The next season, Offor scored his first goal of the season on 25 June 2020 in a 6–0 victory over Tukums 2000. Offor then scored his first professional brace on 29 June in a 4–2 victory over Metta.

In July 2020, Offor moved to RFS, also in the Latvian league. He made his debut and scored his first goal for the club on 21 July in a 3–0 victory over Tukums 2000. He ended his second season in Latvia with 21 matches and 10 goals scored.

Chicago Fire
On 13 November 2020, Offor joined Major League Soccer club Chicago Fire. He made his debut for the Fire on 17 April 2021 against the New England Revolution, starting in the 2–2 draw. He then scored his first goal for the Fire on 7 July in a 3–1 victory against Orlando City.

Career statistics

References

External links
 Profile at Chicago Fire

2000 births
Sportspeople from Anambra State
Living people
Nigerian footballers
Association football forwards
Real Sapphire F.C. players
BFC Daugavpils players
FK RFS players
Chicago Fire FC players
Chicago Fire FC II players
CF Montréal players
S.V. Zulte Waregem players
Latvian Higher League players
Major League Soccer players
Belgian Pro League players
Nigerian expatriate footballers
Expatriate footballers in Northern Cyprus
Nigerian expatriate sportspeople in Northern Cyprus
Expatriate footballers in Latvia
Nigerian expatriate sportspeople in Latvia
Expatriate soccer players in the United States
Nigerian expatriate sportspeople in the United States
Expatriate footballers in Belgium
Nigerian expatriate sportspeople in Belgium